MonstrO was an American rock band composed of drummer Bevan Davies (formerly of Still Rain, Danzig and Bloodsimple), lead guitarist Juan Montoya (formerly of Torche), singer/rhythm guitarist Charlie Suarez (formerly of Sunday Driver), and bassist Kyle Sanders (formerly of Bloodsimple and brother of Mastodon bassist Troy Sanders). 

They formed in late 2009 in Atlanta, Georgia and played their first gig in April 2010. The band drew upon music such as 1960s psychedelia, shoegaze, and heavy metal, as well as other personal influences. They signed with Vagrant Records in March 2011. Their self-titled debut album was released in August 2011, produced by William DuVall. They toured as the opening act for Clutch in 2012. The band has been inactive since 2013. Bassist Kyle Sanders joined heavy metal band Hellyeah in 2014 and remained with that band until it went on hiatus in 2021.

Members
Bevan Davies – drums
Kyle Sanders – bass, vocals
Juan Montoya – lead guitar
Charlie Suarez – rhythm guitar, vocals

Discography
MonstrO (2011, Vagrant Records)

References

Alternative rock groups from Georgia (U.S. state)
Musical groups established in 2009
American hard rock musical groups
Vagrant Records artists